Unchained Spirit is a studio album by the dancehall/reggae artist Buju Banton, released in 2000. It was his first and only album to be released on the ANTI- record label, an imprint of Epitaph Records.

The album peaked at No. 128 on the Billboard 200.

Production
The album contains contributions from Stephen Marley, Rancid, and Beres Hammond, among others.

Critical reception

Exclaim! wrote that "the treacle far outstrips anything resembling a tuff rhythm here ... even over the good rhythms, Buju doesn't seem to have the command he once did." The Star Tribune thought that "Buju's grainy voice flows over slowly distilled lattices of rhythms and multi-part South African-style harmonies." M.F. DiBella of AllMusic defined the album as a "a vital and rhythmic mix of homegrown Jamaican philosophy, biblical harmonizing, and just plain eerie dancehall".

Track listing
"Intro" – 0:39
"23rd Psalm" (feat. Gramps of Morgan Heritage) – 5:44
"Voice Of Jah" (feat. LMS) – 5:01
"Sudan" – 4:41
"We'll Be Alright" (feat. Luciano) – 4:24
"Pull It Up" (feat. Beres Hammond) – 4:09
"Life Is A Journey" – 4:07
"Better Must Come" – 4:12
"Mighty Dread" – 5:01
"Poor Old Man" (feat. Stephen Marley) – 4:26
"Law And Order" – 3:51
"Guns And Bombs" – 3:20
"Woman Dem Phat" – 3:16
"No More Misty Days" (feat. Rancid) – 4:01
"Pull It Up" (feat. Beres Hammond) (live) – 2:56
"Reunion" (feat. Wayne Wonder) – 4:06

References

2000 albums
Anti- (record label) albums
Buju Banton albums